The Men's C-2 500m event at the 2010 South American Games was held over March 28 at 10:20.

Medalists

Results

References
Final

500m C-2 Men